Hugh Kaufman (born January 14, 1943), better known as the Rubber Chicken Man, is a Washington Nationals baseball fan who can be seen at most games at Nationals Park waving a rubber chicken over the Nationals dugout to ward off bad "juju" or bad luck. Sports reporters writing for The Washington Post have written about his giving chicken soup to struggling Nats players to improve their play and that his ritual "sacrificing" of chickens often seems to precede turnarounds in the Nationals' performance.  As an employee of the Environmental Protection Agency, Kaufman has repeatedly been a whistleblower, including matters relating to the Rita Lavelle convictions and the post-9-11 cleanup of Ground Zero.

Kaufman was born January 14, 1943, in Washington, D.C., where he became a fan of the old Washington Senators. He continues his father's tradition of keeping box score statistics of each game.

According to a Topps baseball card issued for Rubber Chicken Man, in 2005 "a rubber chicken was sacrificed over the dugout and the team played over .500 after that point. The team likes the tradition, so every year he sacrifices a rubber chicken.

That same year, Nats slugger José Guillén was struggling and apparently needed surgery.  Kaufman gave him a serving of his Jewish grandmother’s chicken soup from a 19th century Hungarian recipe. “By the 7th or 8th inning, he was feeling better,” Kaufman recalled to a Post reporter. “He went in the game, and he scored the winning run.”

 In May 2012, when the Nationals were a slump, Nats manager Davey Johnson was asked whether the team was "snakebitten" after several injuries. "There’s been superstitions, to change our luck and do different kinds of things. Sacrifice a chicken or something," Johnson replied.

Kaufman answered Johnson's call by sacrificing a rubber chicken outside the stadium, as he had done numerous times over the previous ten years. “I think Davey has recognized the whole history of baseball Voodoo," he told a local baseball blogger. Kaufman follows the orthodox Jewish tradition of Kaporos, in which chickens were ritually sacrificed before the Yom Kippur holiday. “This is an offshoot of that,” Kaufman told the writer before pulling out his butcher knife. “That’s where you transfer the sins to the animal, and so if there are any hidden sins in that Nats locker room, Cool Heat or something like that, that gets transferred to the chicken so when you take the head off, that gets rid of the bad Juju.”

In the summer of 2014, the Nationals began a successful run to win the Eastern Division title. On June 11, Washington Post reporter Neil Greenberg wrote that they had "brought their record to 9–3 since fans sacrificed a rubber chicken. Yes, you read that right."

See also
Paul the Octopus

References

1943 births
Per
Baseball spectators
Sportspeople in Washington, D.C.
Living people
People of the United States Environmental Protection Agency